BBC WebWise  is both the BBC's  archived guide to the internet for computer novices as well as some videos. Created in 1998, it consisted and on the archive, consists  of a series of articles and videos.  It also incorporates elements of another BBC website, BBC raw computers.  All BBC websites are required to link to WebWise when using content which requires a plug-in.

History
BBC WebWise was created in 1998 to encourage new users to explore the internet, as part of a wider BBC campaign which included TV and radio programmes. By December 1999 it consisted of articles, columns, a blog, message boards and a Q&A section. A wide range of freelance writers were attached to the project, including Charlie Brooker and Bill Thompson (resident columnist with WebWise until 2008).

In 2004, WebWise launched a 10-hour accredited course, called Becoming WebWise.

Current features
WebWise was completely redesigned and relaunched in September 2010, with articles on a variety of computer-related subjects written by well-known technology writers such as Bill Thompson, Wendy M. Grossman and Jack Schofield. It formerly contained new courses, and also has a weekly column, and a large A to Z of technical terms.

References

BBC New Media
Broadcasting websites
British educational websites